Pataveh-ye Delita (also Romanized as Paţāveh-ye Delītā; also known as Pā Ţāveh, Pātāveh, Paţāveh-ye Kameyān, and Peţāveh) is a village in Ludab Rural District, Ludab District, Boyer-Ahmad County, Kohgiluyeh and Boyer-Ahmad Province, Iran. At the 2006 census, its population was 14, in 4 families.

References 

Populated places in Boyer-Ahmad County